Duda Wendling (born 19 June 2006) is a Brazilian actress. She began her career as an actress in 2012, known for productions such as Avenida Brasil, Mato Sem Cachorro, Valetins and Cumplices de um Resgate.

Career 
Duda began her acting career in 2012, playing Clarinha in the soap opera Avenida Brasil on Rede Globo. 
In 2013 she acted alongside Bruno Gagliasso in the film Mato Sem Cachorro. In 2015 acted in the soap opera Cumplices de um Resgate of SBT, in 2017 acted in the film Poesias Para Gael of Telemilênio Brasil, in 2018 she was part of the cast of Super Chefinhos of Rede Globo, in 2019 she starred in the series Valentins of TV Cultura and acted in Rede Globo's soap opera Verão 90. Em 2021 fez parte da série Os Veganitos.

Filmography
{| class="wikitable sortable"
|+ Television + Film
|-
! Year
! Title
! Role
|-
| 2012
| Avenida Brasil
| Clarinha
|-
| 2013 
| Mato Sem Cachorro
| Lara
|-
|-
| 2013 
| Joia Rara
| Julia 
|-
| 2015
| Cumplices de Um Resgate
| Doris
|-
| 2017
| Poesias Para Gael
| Eline Kid
|-
| 2018
| Super Chefinhos
| Herself
|-
| 2019
| Valentins
| Lila Valentim
|-
| 2019
| Verão 90
| Isadora Ferreira
|-
| 2021
| Os Veganitos
| Herself
|-
|-
| 2022
| Stupid Wife 
| Sara

References

External links
 

2006 births
Living people